The Nio ES6 is a battery-powered, 5-seat mid-size luxury SUV manufactured by Chinese electric car company Nio. The ES6 is the second SUV product by Nio, announced at Nio Day in December 2018 and was put into production in 2019 for the Chinese market.

Specifications 

The ES6 is powered by a lithium-ion battery pack, a package that is also swappable just like the Nio ES8.

The ES6 is a 5-seater mid-size production SUV, with a wheelbase of 2,900 mm and a body length of 4,850 mm. The body and chassis are completely aluminum, and the drivetrain is all-wheel drive standard, and featured active air suspension. The design includes the X-bar and Nio's signature "Spark Beat" taillights. he acceleration time from 0-100 km/h is 4.7 seconds.

The Nio ES6 was the world's first SUV with both permanent magnet and induction motors.  With a dual-motor four-wheel drive system with a peak power of up to 400 kW (544 hp) and a maximum torque of 725 Nm, the Nio ES6 accelerates from 0 to 100 km/h in 4.7 seconds. The ES6 is powered by a lithium-ion battery pack, a package that is also swappable just like the Nio ES8. The range of the car with the 100kWh battery is up to 610 km NEDC. 

The price of the ES6 ranges from ￥358,000 to ￥468,000

Competitors 

The ES6 has multiple rivals in the Chinese electric SUV market. It competes against the Roewe Marvel X, Aion LX, Weltmeister EX6, BMW iX3, and Tesla Model Y.

References 

ES6
Cars introduced in 2018
Production electric cars
Crossover sport utility vehicles